Brina Bozic (born 22 May 1992) is a Slovenian recurve archer. 

She competed in the individual recurve event at the 2015 World Archery Championships in Copenhagen, Denmark.

References

External links
http://www.theinfinitecurve.com/archery/brina-bozic/
http://www.fieldarcher.org/index.php?full=1&set_albumName=WC2014_Mugshots&id=Brina_Bozic&option=com_gallery&Itemid=12&include=view_photo.php
http://worldgames2013.sportresult.com/nh/en/240/Participant/ParticipantInfo/172579d0-6988-469e-827f-38008c512390
http://www.archery-si.org/top-2010-2013/1-grand-prix-srebrna-medalja-ul-mesana-ekipa-brina-bozic-in-jaka-komocar 

Slovenian female archers
Living people
Place of birth missing (living people)
1992 births
Archers at the 2010 Summer Youth Olympics